Derian John Hatcher (born June 4, 1972) is an American former professional ice hockey defenseman who played 16 seasons in the National Hockey League (NHL) with the Minnesota North Stars, Dallas Stars, Detroit Red Wings and Philadelphia Flyers. He is currently an owner of the Sarnia Sting of the Ontario Hockey League (OHL).

He is the younger brother of former NHL player Kevin Hatcher, with whom he was inducted into the United States Hockey Hall of Fame on October 21, 2010. In 2015, Hatcher and David Legwand, a fellow OHL alumnus, NHL player and Michigan native, purchased and became co-owners of the  Sarnia Sting.

Playing career
As a youth, Hatcher played in the 1985 and 1986 Quebec International Pee-Wee Hockey Tournaments with the  Detroit Compuware minor ice hockey team.

Hatcher was known as a physical defenseman and a strong bodychecker and used his intimidating size to good effect. He was drafted in the 1st round as the eighth overall selection by the Minnesota North Stars in the 1990 NHL Entry Draft and scored in his NHL debut game on October 12, 1991. Hatcher played for the North Stars and went with them when they moved to Dallas in 1993.

Hatcher played another ten years for the Dallas Stars, collecting 71 goals, 223 assists, 1,380 penalty minutes, and captained the Stars to the Stanley Cup in 1999. In doing so, he became the first American-born captain to win the Stanley Cup. In July 2003, Hatcher signed with the Detroit Red Wings on a five-year, $30 million contract. A knee injury in just the third game of the season forced Hatcher to miss most of the year, playing in just 15 regular season games with the Red Wings.

In 2004, due to the cancellation of the NHL season, Hatcher, along with fellow Detroit Red Wings teammates Chris Chelios and Kris Draper, decided to play minor league hockey with the Motor City Mechanics based out of Fraser, Michigan.

On August 2, 2005, Hatcher signed with the Philadelphia Flyers after his contract with Detroit was bought out due to the new salary cap.

On January 29, 2006, Hatcher was named interim captain of the Flyers. He served as captain for the rest of the 2005–06 season due to the absence of injured captain Keith Primeau. Hatcher has also served as an alternate captain for the Flyers.

Suffering from a right knee injury, he missed the entire 2008–09 NHL season. Hatcher later returned as a "co-coach" for the playoffs. After having replacement surgery on the same knee on June 1, 2009, Hatcher said that he would most likely not return to playing hockey. On June 15, 2009, Hatcher formally announced his retirement from the NHL, done so with the Dallas Stars. He remained in the Flyers organization as a player development coach, taking a job vacated by another former Flyer defenseman and captain, Éric Desjardins, who resigned to pursue business interests. Hatcher remains the longest-serving captain in the history of the Dallas Stars and their predecessor, the Minnesota North Stars.

Awards
Played in NHL All-Star Game - 1997
1999 Stanley Cup champion
NHL Second All-Star Team - 2003
Inducted into the United States Hockey Hall of Fame - 2010

Personal life
A native Michigander, Hatcher continues to live in the state today. He and his brother Kevin Hatcher, also a former NHL player, previously owned a bar/restaurant in Utica, Michigan.

In 2015, Hatcher, along with David Legwand, purchased the OHL's Sarnia Sting.  Hatcher served as head coach of the team, with Legwand as an assistant coach, from 2015 to 2021.

Career statistics

Regular season and playoffs

International

See also
Notable families in the NHL
List of NHL players with 1,000 games played

References

External links

NOTE: The 1994–95 NHL season began with Mark Tinordi as captain of the Dallas Stars, but he was traded to the Washington Capitals in January 1995. Broten was then named captain, but was traded to the New Jersey Devils in February 1995, and then Hatcher was named captain. In addition, Hatcher served as captain of the Philadelphia Flyers for most of the  season after Keith Primeau suffered a career-ending injury.

1972 births
American men's ice hockey defensemen
Dallas Stars players
Detroit Red Wings players
Ice hockey coaches from Michigan
Ice hockey players at the 1998 Winter Olympics
Ice hockey players at the 2006 Winter Olympics
Ice hockey players from Michigan
Kalamazoo Wings (1974–2000) players
Living people
Minnesota North Stars draft picks
Minnesota North Stars players
Motor City Mechanics players
National Hockey League All-Stars
National Hockey League first-round draft picks
North Bay Centennials players
Olympic ice hockey players of the United States
Philadelphia Flyers captains
Philadelphia Flyers coaches
Philadelphia Flyers players
Sarnia Sting coaches
Sportspeople from Sterling Heights, Michigan
Stanley Cup champions
United States Hockey Hall of Fame inductees